The Elephant Princess is an Australian children's television series that first screened on Network Ten in 2008. The series is produced by Jonathan M. Shiff Productions. A second season began screening in 2011. The series revolves around a suburban Australian teenager, who discovers she is the heir to the throne of Manjipoor, a fictional Indian kingdom.

Summary
Alex  Wilson thinks she is an average suburban girl living in Melbourne, until her 16th birthday when exotic visitor, Kuru, shows up in her backyard with a magical elephant, Anala. He informs her she is the heir to the throne of the magical Indian kingdom of Manjipoor. With his help, the reluctant princess will master her magic powers and defend her royal inheritance against her devious cousin, Vashan, whilst balancing the pull of both worlds to find her true destiny. In the second season, Alex and her family have moved to the Gold Coast. Her friend Amanda has followed her there, where they attend university and plan to find a new drummer for their band. Meanwhile, in Manjipoor, Diva has returned to take over Manjipoor and learn the secrets of The Book.

Episodes

Cast

Main
Emily Robins as Alexandra "Alex" Wilson, Alex is the main protagonist of this series and the princess of Manjipoor. Sometimes she sleeps in, she is messy now and again and sometimes forgets to do her homework. In other words, she is a normal teenage girl, living in a very normal suburb. Alex is sometimes short tempered and carefree but is still a loyal person. Ask her what she really wants in life, and she'll say she wants her band to be big! In the second episode her full birth name was revealed to be Liliuokalani Parasha Kaled Persephone Amanirenas. 
Miles Szanto as Kuru, is Alex's faithful servant who always tries to protect her. He was sent from Manjipoor along with Anala to teach Alex about her magical powers and preparing her to become a princess. At first he did not really fit in well but he soon adjusted to Earth. 
Maddy Tyers as Amanda (recurring, season 1; main, season 2), is Alex's fashion obsessed best friend. Like Alex she is one of the lead singers of the band. At first when Alex told her and JB her secret, because they saw Anala, they thought that she was joking. But when she proved it to them by doing a magic trick with a lot of bunnies they believed her. She falls for Taylor in season two when they go to the Gold Coast of Australia and become a band.
Emelia Burns as Diva (recurring, season 1; main, season 2), was Vashan's "assistant" in season one. At the final battle she revealed that she was a 600-year-old witch to Vashan and the others by using her powers on them. When she learns that her magic gives her great power, she threatens Alex's rule of Manjipoor.
Georgina Haig as Zamira (season 2), is Caleb's younger sister and a childhood friend of Kuru's. She takes an instant dislike to Alex because she believes that her mother was killed by Alex's mother. In the end it was discovered that Diva was the murderer.
Richard Brancatisano as Caleb (season 2), is Alex's love interest in series two. At first he tries to flirt with her but she finds it annoying. But soon she spends time with him, being that she visits Majipoor a lot and he works there. Soon the two develop a bond forming an up and down relationship with so much drama in it.
Eka Darville as Taylor (season 2), is a close friend of Alex and Amanda. When he discovered Alex's secret he almost had the same reactions as Amanda and JB. But he was okay with it. He is Amanda's boyfriend and plays the drums in their band. He is very caring and a loyal friend. He appeared in all episodes of season two.
Siam as Anala

Supporting
Sebastian Gregory as JB (season 1), who was best friends and band mates with Alex and Amanda. He can be described as desperate and girl crazy. He is not mentioned in season two.
Damien Bodie as Vashan (season 1), is Alex's evil minded cousin. He has tried a variety of ways to destroy Alex or take away the transporting jewel from Anala. He would taunt Alex a lot in season one. At the end of the season when Diva was in strong power he ended up losing all of his. He does not return in season two.
Liam Hemsworth as Marcus (season 1), was Alex's former crush and boyfriend in season one. He joined Alex's band and adjusted well into it. But Kuru took an instant dislike to him as Alex and his relationship was near the end of it. Even though Marcus is caring and thoughtful, he would always get jealous and suspicious of Kuru. That is what led to his and Alex's break up. He was not mentioned in season two or after his departure from the show.
Brett Climo as Omar (season 1), the queen's advisor and Alex's biological father.
Alyce Platt as Anita Wilson, Alex's adoptive mother.
Grant Piro as Jim Wilson, Alex's adoptive father.
Eva Lazzaro as Zoe Wilson, Alex's adoptive younger sister and Jim and Anita's biological daughter.
Alexandra Park as Veronica (season 2)
Sebastian Angborn as Senq (season 2)

Multimedia

DVD releases

The complete first and second series has been released in three volumes, although the complete season one and two has been released too.

International broadcasts
: "The Elephant Princess", Network Ten
: "Alexandra, a Princesa do Rock", Nickelodeon (Portuguese)
: "The Elephant Princess", Ketnet
: "Принцесата на слоновете" BTV Comedy
: "The Elephant Princess", Family Channel
: "Alexandra, La Princesa del Rock", Nickelodeon and Megavisión
: "Elefanttiprinsessa" YLE Areena
: "Son Altesse Alex" Gulli, Nickelodeon
: "Elephant Princess – Zurück nach Manjipoor" (1. season) & "Elephant Princess – Die Rettung von Manjipoor" (2. season) ZDF
: "Elefánt hercegnő", Nickelodeon
: "The Elephant Princess", Disney Channel
: "Nesichath HaPilim", Israeli Kids Channel
: "Elephant Princess", Rai 3
: "The Elephant Princess", Z@PP
: "Elefant Prinsessen", Nrk Super
: "The Elephant Princess", Nickelodeon Pakistan
: "Księżniczka z Krainy Słoni", Nickelodeon Poland
: "A Princesa Elefante", SIC and Nickelodeon 
: "Printesa din Taramul Elefantilor", Nickelodeon
: "Принцесса слонов", Carousel and Nickelodeon Russia
: "The Elephant Princess" Nickelodeon/DStv
: "Elefantprinsessan", SVT Barnkanalen, Nickelodeon, HBO
: "La princesa elefante", Disney Channel
: "Hasthi Kumariya", TV Derana
: "Слон і принцеса", TET
: "The Rock Princess" (Previously "The Elephant Princess"), Nickelodeon
: "The Elephant Princess", Primo TV
: "Nàng công chúa bí ẩn", HTV3 Vietnam

See also
 Naagin

References

External links
 The Elephant Princess – ZDF Enterprises promotional website
 The Elephant Princess at the Australian Television Information Archive
 
 
 

2000s teen drama television series
2010s teen drama television series
2008 Australian television series debuts
2011 Australian television series endings
Australian adventure television series
Australian children's television series
Australian children's fantasy television series
Network 10 original programming
English-language television shows
Television shows set in Melbourne
Television shows set in Gold Coast, Queensland
India in fiction
Television series about elephants
Television series about princesses
Television series about teenagers